The following is a list of notable alumni, non-graduates, lecturers, professors and administrators affiliated with the Thammasat University (TU).

Heads of government 

Alumni
 Tanin Kraivixien, LLB 1948 – Prime Minister of Thailand, 1976–1977
 Chuan Leekpai, LLB 1962 – Prime Minister of Thailand, 1992–1995; 1997–2001

Founder and professors

 Pridi Banomyong – Prime Minister of Thailand, 1946; regent for Ananda Mahidol; Free Thai Movement founder; Khana Ratsadon civilian faction leader; professor of Law
 Sanya Dharmasakti – Prime Minister of Thailand, 1973–1975; former president of the Privy Council of Thailand; former president of the Supreme Court; professor of Law
 Major General Mom Rajawongse (M.R.) Kukrit Pramoj – Prime Minister of Thailand, 1975–1976; National Artist of Thailand 1985; author

Academics 

 Thongchai Winichakul, BA 1981 - professor in the History Department, University of Wisconsin–Madison; specialist in the intellectual and cultural history of Thailand

Law

Government and politics 

 Kaewsan Atibodhi, LLB –  politician; former senator for Bangkok; former vice rector of Thammasat University; former law lecturer at Thammasat University
 Chuwit Kamolvisit (born 1961) - Bachelor of Accounting, Master of Political Science; "massage parlor" owner, leader of Rak Thailand Party
 Puey Ungpakorn, 1937 – former governor of the (Central) Bank of Thailand; Magsaysay Award winner 1965; Free Thai member; professor

Arts and media

Film, television and music 

 Pathit Pisitkul - Bachelor of Business Administration; TV actor
 Aniporn Chalermburanawong - Bachelor of Social Studies; beauty queen, winner Miss Universe Thailand 2015, Top 10 at Miss Universe 2015
 Metawin Opas-iamkajorn - Bachelor of Economics; Actor, Model, Singer

Authors and journalists 

 Nitipoom Navaratna - MA 1991 – politician; columnist
 Thommayanti alias Wimon Chiamcharoen - diploma (Faculty of Commerce and Accountancy); novelist (National Artist of literature 2012)
 Suwat Woradilok – writer; National Artist of Thailand 1991; civil servant
 Kanok Ratwongsakul, - (B.A. Journalism and Mass Communication) Newsreader and Senior Vice President Reporter Nation Broadcasting Corporation Pub Co., Ltd.

Business and finance 

 Boonchu Rojanastien (1921–2007) - Bachelor of Accounting, general manager of the Bangkok Bank; "economics tsar" of Thailand, Minister of Finance (1975–76); Deputy Prime Minister (1980–81; 1992–94); leader of Palang Dharma Party (1992–95)

References

Thammasat University
Thammasat